is a train station in Miyazaki City, Miyazaki Prefecture, Japan.

Lines

Layout 
The station, which is unstaffed, consists of a side platform serving a single track at grade set in a largely residential area. There is no station building, only a shelter on the platform for waiting passengers.

Adjacent stations

History
The station closed when the Miyazaki Railway ceased operations on 1 July 1962. Subsequently, Japanese National Railways (JNR) extended its then Shibushi Line north from  towards Minami-Miyazaki on the same route and reopened Minamikata as an intermediate station on 8 May 1963. With the privatization of JNR on 1 April 1987, the station came under the control of JR Kyushu.

Passenger statistics
In fiscal 2016, the station was used by an average of 89 passengers (boarding only) per day.

See also
List of railway stations in Japan

References

External links
Minamikata (JR Kyushu)

Railway stations in Miyazaki Prefecture
Railway stations in Japan opened in 1913
Miyazaki (city)